Cairo Festival City, a real estate development owned by the Futtaim conglomerate, is a mixed-use urban community located east of the ring road in New Cairo, Egypt, and north of 90 St. The development is around 3 million sq. m (700 acres) in size and comprises houses, apartments, business districts, a shopping mall, international schools, automotive parks, and office spaces. It contains the largest shopping mall in New Cairo.

Oriana Villas 
The development hosts the gated residential community named Oriana Villas. The community comprises 600 villas, extending over 830,000 square meters.

Festival Living Apartments 
Festival Living Apartments are located Northwest of Cairo Festival City, near the shopping mall and Oriana Villas.

Cairo Festival City Mall 
Cairo Festival City Mall is a regional shopping center located in Cairo Festival City. The mall extends over 158,000 square meters spread on three levels, with the furniture store IKEA, hypermarket Carrefour, and four department stores (Debenhams, H&M, Marks & Spencer and ZARA). The retail mall was built by an Al-Futtaim Carillion Orascom Construction Industries Joint Venture and was completed in November 2013.

The mall includes a village area with some 35 restaurants surrounding a water fountain and an amphitheater. East of the amphitheater is The Marquee Theatre with 1,656 seats. Since its inauguration in 2015, The Marquee hosted a series of international and regional performances, some of which are the international productions of Thriller Live and Dora as well as the regional TEDxCairo.

Business District 
The Business District at Cairo Festival City is divided into a northern and a southern districts; both accommodate more than 250,000 square meters of office space with more than 11,000 parking slots, in addition to high-tech business facilities. The Business Districts are equipped with security services, infrastructure operations, property maintenance and repairs, in addition to traffic management and control, all set within landscaped environment.

References

External links

New Cairo